Create Music Group is an independent American music distribution and publishing company founded in 2015 by Jonathan Strauss and Alexandre Williams. The company is headquartered in Los Angeles, California. The company provides music distribution, rights management and music publishing.

History

Create Music Group was founded in 2015 by CEO Jonathan Strauss and COO Alexandre Williams. Strauss invested $1 million into the company and later raised a seed round of $2.25 million in exchange for a minority share. The company began by collecting unclaimed revenue for EDM artists on YouTube. , Create Music Group monetizes approximately 9 billion streams a month.

In 2016, Create Music Group acquired distribution company Label Engine, a company that Williams had previously worked for. The company distributes for clients such as Insomniac Records, YNW Melly and 6ix9ine. The company also acquired Flighthouse, a digital media brand.

In 2018, Create Music Group announced the launch of its music publishing division with the signing of 6ix9ine.

Following the launch of their publishing division, Create Music Group distributed 6ix9ine's Dummy Boy album after the release was leaked. They also released "Gooba", 6ix9ine's first single after being released from prison. The label scored its first Billboard Hot 100 number one with 6ix9ine and Nicki Minaj's "Trollz".

References

External links
 Create Music Group website

2015 establishments in California
American independent record labels
Record labels established in 2015